Field hockey at the Friendship Games was contested in two events. Men's event took place at the Minor Arena of the Central Dynamo Stadium in Moscow, Soviet Union between 18 and 26 August 1984. Women's event took place in Poznań, Poland between 28 and 30 August 1984.

Men's event
Eight teams were drawn into two groups.

The host nation, Soviet Union, had two teams in the tournament. However, the Soviet Union "B" team competed "off competition". Despite ending the tournament on the third place, this result was not included in the final rankings. The fourth team (i. e. Zimbabwe) was instead counted as the third place team, etc.

Group A

Results

Group B

Results

Final round

Classification 5th–8th

Final ranking

* – Soviet Union B competed "off competition" and was not included in the final ranking table.

Women's event
Four teams competed in a round-robin tournament.

Results

Second place penalty shootout
Because East Germany and Poland had the same number of points, goals and their match was a draw, a penalty shoot-out was played between the two teams.

Poland won and was ranked second, while East Germany was ranked third.

Winning teams' squads

Medal table

See also
 Field hockey at the 1984 Summer Olympics

Notes

References

Friendship Games
1984 in field hockey
1984 Friendship Games
Friendship Games
1984 Friendship Games